Lucio Grotone (9 November 1928 – 20 March 2017) was a Brazilian boxer. He competed in the men's light heavyweight event at the 1952 Summer Olympics.

References

External links
 

1928 births
2017 deaths
Brazilian male boxers
Olympic boxers of Brazil
Boxers at the 1952 Summer Olympics
Sportspeople from Santos, São Paulo
Pan American Games medalists in boxing
Pan American Games silver medalists for Brazil
Boxers at the 1951 Pan American Games
Light-heavyweight boxers
Medalists at the 1951 Pan American Games
20th-century Brazilian people
21st-century Brazilian people